Sebastiania pachystachya is a species of flowering plant in the family Euphorbiaceae. It was originally described as 'Adenogyne pachystachys'' Klotzsch in 1841. It is native to São Paulo and Paraná, Brazil.

References

Plants described in 1841
Flora of Brazil
pachystachya